Admiral William Gore Jones  (12 March 1826 – 28 May 1888) was a Royal Navy officer who went on to be Commander-in-Chief, East Indies Station.

Naval career
Jones became a lieutenant in 1848. For his service in the Black Sea during the Crimean War, he given the Légion d'honneur, 5th class and the Order of the Medjidie, 5th class. Promoted to captain in 1861, he took command of HMS Princess Royal, Flagship of Sir George King, in 1864. He was appointed Commander-in-Chief, East Indies Station in 1879 and retired in 1887.

References

1826 births
1888 deaths
Royal Navy admirals
Companions of the Order of the Bath
Royal Navy personnel of the Crimean War